Făgețel River may refer to:

 Făgețel, a tributary of the Bancu in Suceava County
 Făgețel, a tributary of the Camenca in Bacău County

See also 
 Făgețel (disambiguation)
 Făget River (disambiguation)
 Fagu River (disambiguation)
 Fagu Roșu River (disambiguation)
 Valea Făgetului River (disambiguation)